"Holding Out for a Hero" is a song recorded by Welsh singer Bonnie Tyler for the soundtrack to the 1984 film Footloose. It later featured on her sixth studio album, Secret Dreams and Forbidden Fire (1986). The track was produced by Jim Steinman, who co-wrote the song with Dean Pitchford and was a Top 40 hit in several European countries, as well as Canada and the United States. Its 1985 re-release in the United Kingdom reached number two (remaining there for three weeks) and topped the singles chart in Ireland.

Background
Paramount Pictures asked Tyler to record a song for the soundtrack to the 1984 film Footloose. She agreed on the condition that Jim Steinman, who was her producer at the time through CBS/Columbia, could work with her on the project. Steinman wrote the song with Dean Pitchford, who co-wrote every song on the soundtrack album. Tyler was invited to the Paramount film studios in Los Angeles to watch the film rushes to see how "Holding Out for a Hero" would fit into the plot.

"Holding Out for a Hero" shares numerous musical elements with "Stark Raving Love", a track from Steinman's solo album Bad for Good (1981), including the piano riff and vocal harmonies.

Critical reception
In a retrospective review, The A.V. Clubs William Hughes stated that the song "displays some of the worst of its decade's (and composer's) typical excesses: The lyrics are laughable, and the heavy-handed synths and piano riffs come dangerously close to cheese", but adds, "The sum of those parts transcends their limitations, hooking directly into pure emotional need like only the greatest of torch songs can."

Writing in Metal Hammer the song was described by Paul Stenning as "the ultimate rock anthem", stating "Only Jim Steinman can get away with such bombastic overtones, in this case the perfect coupling with Tyler's inimitable voice."

Music video
The accompanying music video for "Holding Out for a Hero" was produced by Jeffrey Abelson for Parallax Productions, directed by Doug Dowdle, with the concept by Keith Williams. It was filmed at the Grand Canyon, Arizona, and at Veluzat Ranch, California. It was the second video, released to promote Footloose while featuring no movie footage in the video.

The video sees Tyler escaping from a burning house; the video is set primarily in the vicinity of the burning house and on the edge of the Grand Canyon – interspersed with shots of angelic background singers in white dresses. Evil cowboys dressed in black, carrying neon whips appear before Tyler, threatening her; a cowboy hero dressed in white, brandishing a revolver, appears on horseback and the evil cowboys flee on horseback, with the hero in pursuit. As the song fades out, the hero cowboy appears in front of Tyler.

Tyler was later featured in a parody of the video by David Copperfield.

Live performances
Two recorded performances of "Holding Out for a Hero" have been released on Tyler's concert DVDs Bonnie on Tour (2006) and Live in Germany 1993 (2011), and their respective CD editions.

Cover versions and media usage
"Holding Out for a Hero" has been featured in numerous commercials, film and television soundtracks, and various artists have covered the song.

In 1984, E. G. Daily's version was used as the theme for the television series Cover Up.

In 1984, Miki Asakura's Japanese version was used as the theme for the television series School Wars.

The song was briefly used near the end of the 1988 movie, Short Circuit 2, itself a sequel to the successful family adventure Short Circuit about a lovable, but niave self-aware robot who foils attempts by the government to have it disassembled and studied.

In 2004, Jennifer Saunders recorded a version of the song for Shrek 2. Frou Frou also recorded a version for the credits sequence. Saunders' version would later be used in the opening ceremony for the 2010 Summer Youth Olympics.

Ella Mae Bowen recorded a cover of the song for the 2011 Footloose remake. 

In 2012, Becca Tobin and Marley Rose did this song in the fourth season of Glee.

In 2014 German band Grailknights recorded a metal cover of the song.

In the 2011 video game Saints Row: The Third, the song plays in the background in the final mission. 

The song was used in the Cartoon Network series Regular Show in the 7th episode of season 3, "Eggscellent". The episode won an Emmy Award.

Tyler released re-recordings of the song in 2004 and 2011. In 2013, she recorded a parody of the song for use in a Children in Need fundraising campaign.

In 2021, the song was noted for its appearances in a trailer for Masters of the Universe: Revelation, another trailer for the Guardians of the Galaxy video game, and in the second episode of the Disney+ series Loki, all of which premiered in the same week. This led to a significant increase in downloads and streams, and a placement atop Billboard’s Top TV Songs Chart. 

In February 2022, the song again received media coverage for its use in the seventh episode of the American teen drama series Euphoria.

A Japanese cover of the song by singer Miki Asakura was used in the final battle in the 2022 film, Bullet Train.

In 2023, Adam Lambert covered the song for his album High Drama.

The song appears in the 2023 film, Shazam! Fury of the Gods, during a sequence when the Shazam Family tries to save civilians as a suspension bridge collapses.

Track listings and formats
1984 7" single
"Holding Out for a Hero" – 4:22
"Faster Than the Speed of Night" – 4:40

1984 12" single
"Holding Out for a Hero" (Extended Remix) – 6:19
"Holding Out for a Hero" (Instrumental) – 5:15
"Faster Than the Speed of Night" – 4:40

1991 12"/CD single
"Holding Out for a Hero" – 4:41
"Faster Than the Speed of Night" – 4:40
"Total Eclipse of the Heart" – 6:49

Credits and personnel
Bonnie Tyler – lead vocals
Jim Steinman – producer
John Jansen – associate producer
Greg Edward, Arthur Payson, Neil Dorfsman – recording, mixing
Greg Calbi – mastering
Sterling Smith – piano, synthesizer, Linn drums
Hiram Bullock – guitar
John Philip Shenale – programming, synthesizer
Art Wood – Simmons and Linn drums
Tom "Bones" Malone – trombone, horn arrangements
Michael Brecker – tenor saxophone
Alan Rubin – trumpet
Lew Soloff – trumpet
Jim Pugh – trombone
Dave Taylor – bass trombone
Rory Dodd, Eric Thayer, Holly Sherwood – background vocalists, vocal arrangement
Ellen Foley – additional vocal arrangement

Charts

Year-end charts

Monthly charts

Certifications

References

1984 songs
1984 singles
Bonnie Tyler songs
Jennifer Saunders songs
Songs written by Jim Steinman
Songs written by Dean Pitchford
Song recordings produced by Jim Steinman
Songs from Footloose
Irish Singles Chart number-one singles
CBS Records singles
Rock ballads
Song recordings with Wall of Sound arrangements